Paulo César Cárdenas Riquelme (born 14 January 1988) is a Chilean former professional footballer who played as a forward.

References
 
 

1988 births
Living people
Chilean footballers
Association football forwards
Chilean Primera División players
Primera B de Chile players
Trasandino footballers
Magallanes footballers
Deportes Colchagua footballers
O'Higgins F.C. footballers
People from Rancagua